Kari Lizer (born August 26, 1961) is an American actress, writer, and producer. She was the creator and executive producer of the CBS sitcom The New Adventures of Old Christine. In May 2010, CBS canceled Old Christine after five seasons. Upon its cancellation, Lizer slammed the network and suggested the decision to cancel the show was sexist. Previously, she had been co-executive producer of Will & Grace for three years, for which she was nominated for the Emmy Awards in the Outstanding Comedy Series category.

Lizer also created the comedy Maggie Winters.

As an actress, Lizer played Cassie Phillips on Matlock, Diana Benedict on Sunday Dinner, and Chris Burgess on The Van Dyke Show.

In April 2020, Lizer released her first book, Aren't You Forgetting Someone?: Essays from My Mid-Life Revenge.

Selected filmography

As actress
 Smokey Bites the Dust (1981)
 Private School (1983)
 Gotcha! - Muffy (1985)
 Matlock - Episode - "The Angel" - Margaret Danello (AKA Angel) (1986)
 Growing Pains - Episode: "Born Free" - Stewardess (1987)
 Who's the Boss? - Episode: “There Goes the Bride” - Christy Bower Everett (1987)
 Matlock - Cassie Phillips (1987–1988)
 The Van Dyke Show - Chris Burgess (1988)
 Quantum Leap episode 1.5; "How the Tess Was Won" – Tess McGill (1989)
 Father Dowling Mysteries - Episode - "The Substitute Sister Mystery" - Vickie (1991)
 Diagnosis Murder - Episode - "Death By Extermination" - Lena Prossor (1994)
 Weird Science (5 episodes 1994–1996)
 Breast Men (1997)
 Will & Grace (5 episodes 2001–2004)

As director
 Man with a Plan (1 episode 2019)

As writer
Call Your Mother (2 episodes 2021)
The New Adventures of Old Christine (88 episodes 2006–2010)
Will & Grace (13 episodes 2000–2004)
Maggie Winters (16 episodes 1998–1999)
Weird Science (14 episodes 1994–1997)
Benders (1994)

As producer
Call Your Mother (2021)
Maggie Winters (1998–1999)
The New Adventures of Old Christine (2006–2010)
Will & Grace (2000–2004)

References

External links
 

20th-century American actresses
21st-century American actresses
Actresses from San Diego
American film actresses
American television actresses
Television producers from California
American women television producers
American television writers
Living people
Writers from San Diego
American women television writers
Screenwriters from California
1961 births